Šventybrastis ('sacred ford', formerly) is a village in Kėdainiai district municipality, in Kaunas County, in central Lithuania. According to the 2011 census, the village has a population of 144 people. The village is located on the left bank of the Nevėžis river, by the Brasta rivulet. There are a wooden church of the Transfiguration of Jesus (built in 1744), a monument for independence, four sacred oak trees (a nature monument),  a cemetery, a library. The Šventybrastis Landscape Sanctuary is located nearby, while the Lančiūnava-Šventybrastis Forest is some kilometres away from the village.

History
From ancient times through the Christian Medieval period, Šventybrastis had a pagan shrine where eternal fire burnt. While most of the pagan holy groves were cut down during the era of Christian conversion, the Sacred Oaks at Šventybrastis are some of the few still standing from the pre-Christian era.

Šventybrastis once was a property of the Mleczko family but was transferred to the Zawisza family in the 17th century. In October 1863 the battle between the January Uprising rebels led by Antanas Mackevičius and Tsarist Army occurred in nearby Daniliškis village. 75 rebels were buried in Šventybrastis, by the Brasta rivulet.

Šventybrastis was a volost center but later it was transferred to Apytalaukis and then to Surviliškis. In 1919–1932 there was a school. During the early Soviet era it was a Nevėžis selsovet center.

Demography

Images

References

Villages in Kaunas County
Kėdainiai District Municipality